Jeda may refer to:

 Jeda (born 1979), Jedaias Capucho Neves, Brazilian footballer
 Jedah Dohma, fictional character in game Darkstalkers
 Jedda, Australian film
 Jeddah, Saudi Arabian city
 Jeddah, Battle of Jeddah (1813)
Jeda, Iran, a village in Iran